Many musical works have been created or released without a title.

Albums
 The untitled fifth album by Blink-182, later known as Blink-182, 2003
 _, the untitled tenth album by BT, 2016
 3 Foot Clearance, the untitled thirtieth album by Buckethead, 2010
 Untitled Coma album, 2011
 Untitled Deerhoof EP, 2006
 Untitled Korn album, 2007
 Led Zeppelin IV, the untitled fourth album by Led Zeppelin, 1971
 LP5, the untitled fifth album by Autechre, 1998
 Untitled Muslimgauze compilation
 Untitled Nas album, 2008
 Untitled Prince album or Love Symbol Album
 Untitled Royal Trux album
 Untitled Throbbing Gristle album
 Untitled Trooper album, 1980
 Untitled album by Zoviet France, 1982
 Untitled Rammstein album, 2019

EPs
 Untitled Deafheaven demo EP, 2010
 Untitled EP by Chris Staples (recording as Discover America)
 Unnamed EP by Fuck the Facts
 Untitled Hodgy Beats EP
 Untitled Muslimgauze EP
 Untitled Slint EP
 Untitled Soap&Skin EP
 Untitled Sonny Condell EP
 Untitled Willy Mason EP

Songs and singles
 Track 3 by Animal Collective from Spirit They're Gone, Spirit They've Vanished
 All tracks by Aphex Twin from Selected Ambient Works Volume II, except for "Blue Calx"
 Tracks 2 and 3 by Kelsea Ballerini from "Love Me Like You Mean It"
 Track 8 by Better Than Ezra from Deluxe
 "Song 2" by Blur from Blur
 Track 13 by Garth Brooks from Double Live
 All songs by Buckethead from In Search of The
 Tracks 3, 5, 8 and 10 by Christie Front Drive from Christie Front Drive
 Track 3 by Echosmith from Lonely Generation, later retitled "Cracked"
 All tracks by John Frusciante from disc 2 of Niandra Lades and Usually Just a T-Shirt
 Track 10 by Great White from the Japan and the UK versions of ...Twice Shy
 Track 7 by King Crimson from Islands
 Track 6 by Magic Dirt from Signs of Satanic Youth
 Track 10 by Neutral Milk Hotel from In the Aeroplane Over the Sea
 Tracks 6 and 11 by Oasis from (What's the Story) Morning Glory?
 A hidden track at the end of Frequencies from Planet Ten by Orange Goblin
 Tracks 12 (unofficially titled "Yeah") and 13 by Queen from Made in Heaven
 Track 11 by R.E.M. from Green
 All tracks from Sigur Rós' album
 Several tracks by Squarepusher from Burningn'n Tree
 Untitled track from the album Thawing Dawn by A.Savage.
 All tracks released by The Body Lovers / The Body Haters
 Track 1 from Merzbow and John Watermann's collaboration Brisbane-Tokyo Interlace

Classical works
 Untitled piece for flute, bass clarinet, bassoon, horn, trumpet, piano and cello (1954) by Morton Feldman
 Untitled piece for tape (1972) by Claude Vivier

References

Citations

Untitled